Lestrade-et-Thouels is a commune in the Aveyron department in southern France.

Population

Relation to Inspector Lestrade

The village of Lestrade-et-Thouels is considered as a possible origin of the family name "Lestrade", made famous through the character Inspector Lestrade who appears in numerous Sherlock Holmes stories. Arthur Conan Doyle is known to have given the fictional inspector the name of a friend from his days at the University of Edinburgh, a Saint Lucian medical student, Joseph Alexandre Lestrade. The ancestry of Joseph Lestrade is not sufficiently known to establish a certain link between him and the French village.

See also
Communes of the Aveyron department

References

Lestradeetthouels
Aveyron communes articles needing translation from French Wikipedia